Lake Coleman was a large lake, in the same basin as Lake Ontario, during an interglacial period, approximately 75,000 years ago.  Its level was  higher than Lake Ontario.

Lake Coleman was named after Arthur Philemon Coleman, a respected geologist whose excavations played a role in discovering the existence of the lake.

See also 
Glacial Lake Iroquois, a prehistoric proglacial lake in the same basin as Lake Ontario that existed at the end of the last ice age approximately 13,000 years ago. The level of the lake was approximately 30 meters (~100 ft) above the present level of Lake Ontario.

References 

Coleman